St. Paul's Episcopal Church is a historic Carpenter Gothic-style Episcopal church building located at F and Taylor Streets in Virginia City, Nevada, United States. It was built in 1876 to replace an earlier church that had burned down in 1875. St Paul's Parish, founded on September 1, 1861, is still an active congregation in the Episcopal Diocese of Nevada.

St. Paul's Episcopal Church is a contributing property in the Virginia City Historic District which was declared a National Historic Landmark in 1961 and added to the National Register of Historic Places in 1966.

See also

National Register of Historic Places listings in Nevada
St. Peter's Episcopal Church (Carson City, Nevada)

References

External links

Flickr photo of church today

Churches in Storey County, Nevada
Buildings and structures in Virginia City, Nevada
Episcopal church buildings in Nevada
Historic district contributing properties in Nevada
National Register of Historic Places in Storey County, Nevada
Churches on the National Register of Historic Places in Nevada
19th-century Episcopal church buildings
Churches completed in 1876
1861 establishments in Nevada Territory
Religious organizations established in 1861
Historic American Buildings Survey in Nevada
Carpenter Gothic church buildings in Nevada